Christian Sittler (born 26 February 1954) is an Austrian boxer. He competed in the men's light welterweight event at the 1976 Summer Olympics. At the 1976 Summer Olympics, he defeated Luis Godoy and Narong Boonfuang, before losing to Luis Portillo in the last sixteen.

References

External links
 

1954 births
Living people
Austrian male boxers
Olympic boxers of Austria
Boxers at the 1976 Summer Olympics
Sportspeople from Vienna
Light-welterweight boxers
20th-century Austrian people